Petalonyx is a small genus of flowering plants native to the southwestern United States and northern Mexico. They are known commonly as sandpaper plants, and are most often found in warm, dry desert regions. Sandpaper plants are subshrubs that get their common name from their rough foliage, which is covered in tiny, stiffly curved hairs. They bear racemes of claw-shaped flowers with long stamens extending well beyond the corolla, and unusual in that they emerge from outside the corolla.

Species:
Petalonyx linearis - narrowleaf sandpaper plant
Petalonyx nitidus - shinyleaf sandpaper plant
Petalonyx parryi - Parry's sandpaper plant
Petalonyx thurberi - Thurber's sandpaper plant
Petalonyx crenatus

References

External links
 Calflora Database: Petalonyx species in California — images and info.
Jepson Manual Treatment: Petalonyx

Loasaceae
Flora of Northwestern Mexico
Flora of the Southwestern United States
Flora of the California desert regions
North American desert flora
Taxa named by Asa Gray
Cornales genera